Huaguangjiao One is a Chinese merchant ship, built during the Southern Song dynasty (1127–1279), that sank off the coast of the Paracel Islands (Xisha Islands) in the South China Sea. The ship's name translates as "Magnificent China Reef Wreck #1". It was discovered in 1996 and is currently the oldest hull that China has discovered in the open seas.

Archeological findings
The wreckage covered 180 square meters meaning that the ship would have had an estimated displacement capacity of 60 tons and 11 cabins. 

On 15 March 2007, an archeological salvaging operation was organized by the National Museum of China and the Hainan Provincial Administration of Culture, Radio & Television, Publishing and Sport, and the excavation of the shipwreck site at Huaguang Reef initiated. This operation not only helped the archaeologists involved in the survey locate nearly 10 other shipwrecks in the surrounding area, but also helped establish the first time that China conducted high-seas excavation work.

According to Dr. Zhang Wei, director of the China's Underwater Research Center with the National Museum at the time of the discovery, even though the wreck had been robbed many times and severely damaged by looters, the retrieval of the more than 10,000 pieces of antique pottery and porcelain, which seems to have mainly come from the Fujian and Guangdong kilns, most certainly provide a very important piece of information and undeniable evidence of an already well established maritime trade route, known as the Maritime Silk Road, between China and the rest of the world during the Song and Yuan dynasty (1280–1368).

Artefacts
Many fragments of porcelain and pottery were collected at the site, mostly concentrated in an area of 38 square meters within the reef. Among the items recovered were some exquisite blue white porcelain yielded from the Jingdezhen factory, in Jiangxi province, shadowy blue porcelains, green glazed porcelain plates, pots and other rare antiques. Brown-glazed wares have also been found, indicating the possibility that they might be from an even earlier period in time. 

Many of the items recovered at the archeological site were later presented at a news conference in Haikou city, the capital of south China's Hainan province on 8 May 2007.

See also
Nanhai One, from Yangjiang, Guangdong
Quanzhou ship, from Quanzhou, Fujian
Shinan ship, from Shinan islands, Korea
Maritime archaeology

References

External links
Asian maritime & trade chronology to 1700 CE

1996 archaeological discoveries
History of the Paracel Islands
Merchant ships of China
Shipwrecks in the South China Sea
Shipwrecks of China
Song dynasty
Underwater archaeological sites